Asiana Airlines Inc. is a South Korean airline headquartered in Seoul. In 2019, it accounted for 25% of South Korea's international aviation market and 20% of its domestic market. It maintains its international hub at Seoul's Incheon International Airport, Gimhae International Airport in Busan and its domestic hubs at Gimpo International Airport, also in Seoul.

As a member of Star Alliance, it operates 90 international passenger, 14 domestic passengers, and 27 cargo routes throughout Asia, Europe, North America, and Oceania. As of December 2014, the company employed 10,183 people. Most of Asiana's pilots, ground staff, and flight attendants are based in Seoul. Asiana Airlines is the largest shareholder in Air Busan, a low-cost regional carrier joint venture with Busan Metropolitan City. The airline also holds a 100% share of Air Seoul, a subsidiary and its low-cost carrier.

History

Founding
Korean Air, which was acquired by Hanjin Transportation in 1969, had a monopoly on the South Korean airline industry until the establishment of Asiana in 1988. Asiana's formation did not come about as a policy initiative favoring liberalized market conditions, but rather because of pressure from other chaebols and interests that wanted to compete. It was formed by the Kumho Asiana Group (formerly Kumho Group) and was originally known as Seoul Air International. Asiana was established on 17 February 1988 and started operations in December 1988 with flights to Busan. As of 2007, the airline was owned by private investors (30.53%), Kumho Industrial (29.51%), Kumho Petrochemical (15.05%), foreign investors (11.9%), Korea Development Bank (7.18%), and others (5.83%).

Beginning regular service
Asiana began operations in December 1988, using Boeing 737 Classic aircraft, with flights to Busan and Gwangju. In 1989, Asiana began regular services to Jeju City, Gwangju, and Daegu, and later the same year, began international chartered flights to Sendai in Japan. In 1990, Asiana began its first scheduled international services, to the Japanese cities of Tokyo, Nagoya, Sendai, and Fukuoka. In the same year, Asiana had nine Boeing 747-400s, 20 Boeing 767-300s, and eight Boeing 737-400s. In early 1991, Asiana began services to Bangkok, Singapore, Hong Kong, and Taipei. Transpacific flights to Los Angeles began in December 1991 with a Boeing 747-400 Combi. Services to Vienna, Brussels, and Honolulu began in the mid-1990s. In 1993, Asiana began services in Ho Chi Minh City in Vietnam.

Expansion as a global carrier and joining Star Alliance

Asiana Airlines has rapidly expanded since its establishment in 1988 to become a mid-sized global carrier with a current fleet of 85 aircraft. In December 1998, the airline operated an aircraft on behalf of the president of South Korea for the first time. The airline was listed in KOSDAQ In December 1999. On 28 January 2003, the airline became a full Star Alliance member, expanding its worldwide network and global brand. In 2004, the airline added Airbus A330s and the Boeing 777-200ERs to its fleet, and expanded its routes into mainland China. Currently, it provides international services to 71 cities in 23 countries on 91 routes and domestic services to 12 cities on 14 routes. It also provides international cargo services to 29 cities in 14 countries on 28 routes by Asiana Cargo, the airline's freight division. In 2012, the airline had net sales of US$5.3 billion.

New corporate identity
In February 2006, Asiana Airlines modernized its corporate identity for unification with those of other divisions of its parent company the Kumho Asiana Group. The names of the travel classes have changed from first, business, and economy classes to first, business, and travel classes, respectively, and the colors of the travel classes have changed to yellow, blue, and red for first, business, and travel, respectively. New uniforms were also created for the crew.

Notable achievements
Asiana began to focus on being an environmentally friendly company in the mid-1990s, leading to decisions such as completely banning in-flight smoking and cigarette sales in 1995. The company was awarded first-in-class certification by the International Organization for Standardization (ISO) for meeting the criteria for ISO 14001 in 1996. In 2001, Asiana Airlines was recognized for being the "first environmentally friendly company within the service industry" by the South Korean Ministry of Environment. Some of Asiana's other environmentally minded programs include an emissions measurement and reduction system; reducing pollution from ground facilities; and partnering with the Rainforest Alliance for coffee served on board.

Airline of the Year Awards:

In 2009, Air Transport World awarded Asiana its Airline of the Year award, a coveted and one of the most honorable awards in the airline industry.

In 2010, Asiana Airlines was named Airline of the Year by Skytrax at the 2010 World Airline Awards.

In 2011, Global Traveller awarded the airline 2011 Airline of the Year and the top airliner in six other categories.

In 2012, Business Traveller awarded the airline's 2012 Best Overall Airline in the World.

With these achievements attained over four consecutive years, Asiana Airlines is recognized as a Golden Grand Slam Airline, the first airline to achieve this. Apart from this prestigious title, the company has received the Best Airline for Onboard Service and Flight Attendants for eight consecutive years, among other awards. Asiana Airlines is rated as a "5-Star" airline by Skytrax.

Financial crisis

In April 2019, Asiana Airlines' parent company, Kumho Asiana Group announced its plan to sell Asiana Airlines as a solution to its financial crisis.

The sale of Asiana Airlines began in July 2019. In June 2019, Aekyung Group, the parent company of Korean low-cost carrier Jeju Air, was considered as a strong candidate to take over. Korean Air's parent company, Hanjin Group, and SK Group also considered purchasing.

Asiana Airlines discontinued unprofitable routes throughout July 2019 to October 2019, including Seoul–Incheon to Chicago–O'Hare, Delhi, Khabarovsk and Sakhalinsk.

On 25 July 2019, Kumho Asiana Group, the parent company of Asiana Airlines, officially announced its intention to sell Asiana Airlines for an estimated price of 1.5 to 2.0 trillion won (US$1.26 to 1.68 billion). Asiana Airlines includes subsidiaries Air Busan, Air Seoul, Asiana IDT and other subsidiary companies. AeKyeong Group, the parent company of Jeju Air, has expressed interest in acquiring Asiana Airlines.

On 4 September 2019, Aekyung Group, Mirae Asset Daewoo, and Korea Corporate Governance Improvement applied a letter of intent to acquire Asiana Airlines. On 12 November, a consortium of HDC Hyundai Development Company and Mirae Asset Daewoo was selected as the preferred bidder.

Asiana Airlines has chosen to retire older aircraft, including Boeing 747-400s and Boeing 767-300s, allowing the airline to reduce debt and weakness.

In July 2020, HDC Hyundai Development Company received approval from Russian authorities for its acquisition of Asiana Airlines. However, on 11 September 2020, Korea Development Bank, the primary creditor for Asiana Airlines, and Kumho Asiana Group officially canceled the merger with HDC Hyundai Development Company. Asiana Airlines will be run by creditors until a new owner is approved by the South Korean government.

Merger and acquisition by Korean Air
On 16 November 2020, the Government of the Republic of Korea officially announced that Asiana Airlines will be acquired by Korean Air, which will acquire a 30.77% stake in Asiana from Korea Development Bank. Korea Development Bank, a state-run bank in Korea, will give 800 billion won (600 milion USD) to Hanjin KAL, the holding company of Korean Air. The two airlines will operate as separate brands until integration is complete.  The Ministry of Land, Infrastructure, and Transport will integrate subsidiaries Air Busan, Air Seoul, and Jin Air. The combined low-cost carrier will focus on regional airports in Korea and flying regional Asia-Pacific routes. When Asiana Airlines will withdraw from Star Alliance is unknown, as the surviving brand, Korean Air, is a founding airline within the rival SkyTeam alliance.

In March 2021, Korean Air announced it would delay the merger with Asiana Airlines due to a delay in antitrust approval from the government and six foreign authorities (China, Japan, Taiwan, Thailand, United States, and Vietnam). Korean Air will operate Asiana Airlines as a subsidiary for the next two years, after which it will combine its operation, IT, and other systems into a single system until 2024. Once the merger is complete, Asiana Airlines could become a member of SkyTeam. According to The Korea Times, only Turkey has approved the antitrust deal so far. On June 30, 2021, the post-merger plans between two airlines were reported to have been finalized and approved by Korea Development Bank. In August 2021, the Malaysian Aviation Commission approved the merger between Korean Airlines and Asiana Airlines, citing economical efficiencies and social benefits. On December 26, 2022, the Ministry of Commerce of the People’s Republic of China announced its approval of Korean Air’s business combination with Asiana Airlines.

Corporate affairs
The airline has its global headquarters in Seoul at the Asiana Town in Osoe-dong, Gangseo-gu, Seoul. The airline's head office moved from Hoehyeon-dong, Jung District to Asiana Town in Osoe-dong on 1 April 1998.

Destinations

Asiana Airlines serves destinations on four continents, with an Asian network that includes important cities in the People's Republic of China, Japan, Southeast Asia, and Central Asia. The airline serves several gateway cities in North America and Europe while retaining limited coverage of Oceania.
Asiana Cargo, the airline's cargo subsidiary, also has a wide network, especially in Europe, Asia, and the United States.

Asiana decided to launch Air Seoul, the airline's second subsidiary and its low-cost carrier, based in Incheon International Airport, and transfer some of its unprofitable routes to the subsidiary in November 2016.

Codeshare agreements
Asiana Airlines codeshares with these airlines:

 Air Astana
 Air Busan (Subsidiary)
 Air Canada
 Air China
 Air India
 Air Macau
 Air New Zealand
 Air Seoul (Subsidiary)
 All Nippon Airways
 Austrian Airlines
 Brussels Airlines
 China Southern Airlines
 Copa Airlines
 Croatia Airlines
 Egyptair
 Ethiopian Airlines
 Etihad Airways
 EVA Air
 Hong Kong Airlines
 LOT Polish Airlines
 Lufthansa
 Myanmar Airways International
 Qantas
 Qatar Airways
 S7 Airlines
 Shandong Airlines
 Shenzhen Airlines
 Singapore Airlines
 South African Airways
 Swiss International Air Lines
 Thai Airways International
 Turkish Airlines
 United Airlines

Fleet

Current fleet
, Asiana Airlines operates the following aircraft:

Retired fleet
The company has previously operated the following aircraft:

In-flight services

Asiana Airlines offers five classes of services – First Suite Class, First Class, Business Smartium class, Business class, and Travel (economy) class. Seat configurations and in-flight entertainment systems vary by the type of the aircraft and its operating routes

First Suite class is offered on A380-800, which is serviced on routes to Los Angeles, New York City, Sydney, and Frankfurt. Old First Class is available on Boeing 747-400s. Both First Suite and old First Class were available on Boeing 777s but were later removed in favor of a two-class configuration. Passengers in these classes are offered pajamas, souvenirs, and "amenity kits" containing items such as skin creams, toothpaste, eye shades, and earplugs. A passenger can pre-order in-flight meals 48 hours before departure. First-class seats are equipped with personal AVOD systems.

Besides those routes, most of Asiana's international flights offer two types of classes – business smartium class or business class as the highest class and travel class, without first class. Some of the short-length international flights and charter flights are operated on a mono-class basis, as well as all of the airline's domestic flights. Business Smartium Class is installed on Boeing 777-200ER, and Business Class is installed on Boeing 767 and A330, but some of the A330 are equipped with newly furbished cocoon seats. Most of Asiana's Travel class seats also have television or video systems. AVODs are installed on many of the aircraft and business class is fully equipped with new AVODs. In-flight entertainment systems are not offered on domestic routes, which consist of flights of an hour or less.

Asiana offers two in-flight magazines, Asiana (a travel magazine) and Asiana Entertainment.

Frequent-flyer program
Asiana Club is Asiana Airlines' frequent-flyer program, formerly Asiana Bonus Club. Asiana Club has five tiers: Silver, Gold, Diamond, Diamond Plus, and Platinum. To acquire or maintain each tier, members are required to accrue 0, 20000, 40000, 100000 miles in two calendar years from the 'reference date'. Status miles are based on 'On-board mileage', which includes miles accumulated by traveling with Asiana Airlines or Star Alliance airlines. Also, members can accrue miles by flying 'partner airlines such as Qatar Airways. Miles accumulated in the program entitle members to bonus tickets, class upgrades, and other products and services such as dining at Outback Steakhouse.

Partners
Asiana Club Miles can be collected on all flights operated by Star Alliance member airlines, as well as Air Astana, Etihad Airways and Qatar Airways.

Marketing
Asiana has endorsement deals with the following:
 Park Ji-Sung – Manchester United ambassador
 K. J. Choi –  Professional golfer
 Yang Yong-eun –  Professional golfer
 Chan-Ho Park – ex-MLB pitcher
 YG Entertainment –  record label and talent agency
 JYP Entertainment –  record label and talent agency
 KBS Symphony Orchestra
 Korea National Ballet

Accidents and incidents
 On 26 July 1993, Asiana Airlines Flight 733, a Boeing 737-500 (HL7229) crashed in poor weather about four kilometers short of the runway in Mokpo while making its third landing attempt on runway 06 at Mokpo Airport. Two of the six crew members and 66 of the 110 passengers on board were killed.
 On 11 November 1998, an Asiana Airlines Boeing 747-400 was attempting a U-turn in the gate area of Ted Stevens Anchorage International Airport when the tip of its wing collided with the tail of an Ilyushin Il-62M belonging to Aeroflot. No one was injured. Asiana was subsequently sued by Aeroflot and the Il-62M was written off.
 On 28 July 2011, Asiana Airlines Cargo Flight 991, a Boeing 747-400F bound for Shanghai Pudong International Airport from Incheon International Airport, crashed into the Pacific Ocean off Jeju Island, South Korea, after reporting a fire in the cargo compartment. Both pilots were killed.
 On 6 July 2013, Asiana Airlines Flight 214, a Boeing 777-200ER (HL7742), crashed short of the runway while landing at San Francisco International Airport, due to pilot error, killing 3 of the 307 passengers on board. Two of the fatally injured passengers were not wearing their seat belts and were ejected from the aircraft during the crash. The third died in hospital a week after the incident as a result of her injuries. On 25 February 2014, Asiana Airlines was fined $500,000 by the U.S. Department of Transportation for "failing to promptly contact passengers' families and keep them informed about their loved ones" during and after the crash.
 On 14 April 2015, Asiana Airlines Flight 162, an Airbus A320 (HL7762), crash landed short of the runway at Hiroshima Airport, Japan. The aircraft spun 180 degrees and eventually stopped on the runway with a fractured wing, damage to the left engine, and all landing gear collapsed. The aircraft was operating an international scheduled passenger flight from Incheon International Airport, Seoul, South Korea. More than 20 of the 82 people on board were injured. The aircraft was written off.
 On 9 April 2019, Asiana Airlines Flight 8703, an Airbus A320-232 (HL7772), suffered a 90-degree rotation of the nosegear on landing at Gwangju Airport’s runway 04R. The tires and flanges suffered serious damage.

See also
 Transport in South Korea
 List of companies of South Korea
 List of airlines of South Korea
 List of airports in South Korea
 List of Asian airline holding companies

References

External links

 Asiana Airlines
 Asiana Cargo

 
1988 establishments in South Korea
Airlines established in 1988
Airlines of South Korea
Association of Asia Pacific Airlines
South Korean brands
Kumho Asiana Group
Star Alliance
Companies based in Seoul
Companies listed on the Korea Exchange
Cargo airlines of South Korea
South Korean companies established in 1988
Announced mergers and acquisitions